Oakland's Broadway Auto Row is the area north of downtown Oakland along Broadway between Grand Avenue (Uptown) at the Southwest and I-580, 40th Street or even 51st Street to the Northeast. The strip has a history of car dealerships and other automotive service businesses as far back as 1912. The businesses and sales in the area are a part of Oakland's economic base.  In recent years, the area is seen as ripe for mixed-use development intensification, and other bicycle and pedestrian improvements

Tax base
With annual tax revenues of more than $3 million for years, the dozen or so dealerships on Broadway have historically been one of the city's largest sources of sales tax revenue. During his term in office, former Oakland Mayor Jerry Brown appeared in a series of televised "Buy Oakland" commercials.

Transportation infrastructure
Originally developed as Oakland's first street leading from the Jack London Square waterfront, Broadway remains one of Oakland's busiest streets, carrying copious quantities of peak period private automobile trips, in addition to bus, bicycle and pedestrian traffic.

AC Transit's 51A line runs through the area down Broadway to connect the people of the Rockridge district, and other neighborhoods of North Oakland, with Oakland's Downtown.  The 51A line is one of the system's busiest, carrying a large volume of passengers through the corridor.

A lighted, flashing pedestrian crosswalk is located on a long block of Broadway near 30th street, in-between intersections, to give greater visibility to pedestrian traffic in the area.

A Class 2 bicycle lane runs along the right-hand edge of Broadway, but only between 27th Street and MacArthur Blvd.  As of the summer of 2008, an Oakland bicycle and pedestrian advocacy organization: Walk Oakland Bike Oakland (WOBO) has advocated for expansion of the bike lane to a greater portion of Broadway.

References

Geography of Oakland, California
Auto rows